The dinar was the currency of Croatia between 23 December 1991 and 30 May 1994.

History
The Croatian dinar replaced the 1990 version of the Yugoslav dinar at par. It was a transitional currency introduced following Croatia's declaration of independence. During its existence, the dinar declined in value by a factor of about 70. The dinar was replaced by the kuna at a rate of 1 kuna = 1000 dinara. The currency was not used in the occupied territories comprising the Republic of Serbian Krajina.

Banknotes

The obverse of all banknotes was the same, with a picture of Croatian Dubrovnik scientist Ruđer Bošković. Notes up to 1000 dinara had the Zagreb cathedral on reverse. The higher denominations featured the Ivan Meštrović sculpture History of the Croats on the reverse.

See also

Dinar
Yugoslav dinar
Krajina dinar
Croatian kuna

References

External links

 Croatian dinar - historical banknotes of Croatia 
 Croatian kuna - current banknotes of Croatia 

Modern obsolete currencies
1990s economic history
20th century in Croatia
Currencies of Croatia